Piper Creek may refer to:
 
Piper Creek (Alberta), a tributary of Waskasoo Creek
Piper Creek (Missouri), a tributary of the Pomme de Terre River